Wallis Wood is a   nature reserve south-east of Ewhurst in Surrey. It is managed by the Surrey Wildlife Trust.

A stream runs through this woodland reserve, which has an area of meadow pasture on its bank. Woodland flora include bluebells, broad-leaved helleborine orchids, violet helleborine orchids, common spotted orchids, primroses and wood anemone. There is a rare spider, Hyptiotes paradoxus, which lives in yew trees and is only found in one other site in the county.

There is access from Horsham Road in Walliswood.

References

Surrey Wildlife Trust